Arnaud Monkam Nguekam (born February 22, 1986) is a retired Cameroonian footballer.

Career

SK Brann 

Monkam was set to join Norwegian team SK Brann in January 2006, but after receiving his labour permit, the Norwegian Football Association cancelled his transfer because of their new rules for buying players from other continents.

The Football Association later turned, letting Monkam transfer to Brann because the deal was closed long before the new rules were made. Therefore, Arnaud Monkam joined SK Brann, in February 2006.

Monkam debuted for Brann against Follese in the 1st round of the Norwegian Cup. He's played 3 Norwegian Cup games, 2 UEFA Cup games and 4 Royal League games for Brann. He got his debut in Tippeligaen on November 5, 2006, with seven minutes as a substitute. He was loaned out to Løv-Ham in March 2007. He signed for the 2008 season a permanent contract with Løv-Ham for the season.

Honours 
 2010, 2011, 2012: Elite One champion
 2011: Cameroonian Cup champion

References

External links
 

1986 births
Living people
Cameroonian footballers
Cameroon international footballers
2011 African Nations Championship players
Association football midfielders
Kadji Sports Academy players
SK Brann players
Løv-Ham Fotball players
Coton Sport FC de Garoua players
Union Douala players
AC Léopards players
Elite One players
Eliteserien players
Norwegian First Division players
Cameroonian expatriate footballers
Expatriate footballers in Norway
Cameroonian expatriate sportspeople in Norway
Expatriate footballers in the Republic of the Congo
Cameroonian expatriate sportspeople in the Republic of the Congo
Cameroon A' international footballers